Hopson is a surname. Notable people with the name Hopson include:

Briggs Hopson (born 1965), Republican member of the Mississippi Senate
Dennis Hopson (born 1965), American basketball player and coach
Eben Hopson (1922–1980), Alaskan Native American politician
Eddie Hopson (born 1971), American professional boxer
Hal Hopson (born 1933), American composer and church musician
Howard C. Hopson (1882–1949), American businessman convicted of fraud
James Hopson (born 1935), American paleontologist and professor
Jim Hopson, president and chief executive officer for the Saskatchewan Roughriders of the Canadian Football League
Marcus Hopson (born 1985), American rapper known professionally as Hopsin
Peregrine Hopson (1685–1759), British army officer who saw extensive service during the 18th century and rose to the rank of Major General
Tyrone Hopson (born 1976), American football offensive guard who played in the National Football League
Violet Hopson (1891–1973), American-born British actress

See also
Hopson, Kentucky
Hopson Development, established in Guangzhou, China in 1992, one of the five largest real estate private companies in Guangdong Province
Hopson House, located in Alexandria, Louisiana
Hopson-Swan Estate, national historic district and estate located at Sparkill in Rockland County, New York
Hobson (disambiguation)